The Basque Museum and Cultural Center is an institution in Boise, Idaho focused on Basque culture and history.

It was founded in 1985 and its museum is the only Basque museum in the United States.

References

Museums in Boise, Idaho
American people of Basque descent
Basque culture